The Women's 10 kilometre cross-country skiing event was part of the cross-country skiing programme at the 1976 Winter Olympics, in Innsbruck, Austria. It was the seventh appearance of the event. The competition was held on 10 February 1976, at the Cross Country Skiing Stadium.

Results

References

Women's cross-country skiing at the 1976 Winter Olympics
Women's 10 kilometre cross-country skiing at the Winter Olympics
Oly
Cross